8th Nova Scotia general election may refer to:

Nova Scotia general election, 1799, the 8th general election to take place in the Colony of Nova Scotia, for the 8th General Assembly of Nova Scotia
1894 Nova Scotia general election, the 30th overall general election for Nova Scotia, for the (due to a counting error in 1859) 31st Legislative Assembly of Nova Scotia, but considered the 8th general election for the Canadian province of Nova Scotia